The 1970–71 Marquette Warriors men's basketball team represented Marquette University in NCAA Division I men's competition in the 1970–71 academic year. The Warriors  were ranked either No. 1 or No. 2 from January 1971 through the end of the regular season and finished the regular season undefeated with a record of 28–0. The team advanced to the 1971 NCAA University Division basketball tournament where it defeated Miami and SEC champion Kentucky, but lost to Ohio State. The team finished with a 28–1 record.

The team was coached by Al McGuire who was selected by the Associated Press as the college coach of the year for the 1970-71 season.  McGuire was later inducted into the Naismith Memorial Basketball Hall of Fame.

Guard Dean Meminger was the team's captain and leading scorer, averaging 21.2 points per game. Center Jim Chones was the leading rebounder with an average of 11.5 rebounds per game. After the season, Meminger was selected as a first-team player on the 1971 All-America team, and Chones received first-team honors on the 1972 All-America team.  Meminger and Chones both went on to have successful careers in professional basketball.

The team's sole loss was by a 60-59 score against Ohio State in the NCAA Tournament. Pacific Eight Conference referee Mel Ross called a controversial fifth and final foul on Meminger, depriving Marquette of its most valuable player for the game's final five minutes. After the season, Marquette named referee Ross to its "all-opponent team".

Prior to losing to Ohio State, Marquette had compiled a 39-game winning streak dating back to the previous season.

Roster

Schedule

Rankings

References

Marquette
Marquette
Marquette Golden Eagles men's basketball seasons
Marquette Warriors men's basketball
Marquette Warriors men's basketball